Centenary World Cup may refer to:
 1995 Rugby League World Cup, hosted by England and celebrating the 100th birthday of Rugby league
 2008 Rugby League World Cup, hosted by Australia and celebrating the 100th birthday of Rugby league in Australia